

Belgium
 Belgian Congo – Henri Cornelis, Governor-General of Belgian Congo (1958–1960)
Belgian Congo gained independence on 30 June 1960, renamed Republic of the Congo (Léopoldville)

France
 French Somaliland – Jacques Marie Julien Compain, Governor of French Somaliland (1958–1962)

Portugal
 Angola – 
 Horácio José de Sá Viana Rebelo, High Commissioner of Angola (1956–1960)
 Álvaro Rodrigues da Silva Tavares, High Commissioner of Angola (1960–1961)

United Kingdom
 Aden –
 Sir William Luce, Governor of Aden (1956–1960)
 Sir Charles Johnston, Governor of Aden (1960–1963)
 Malta Colony – Sir Guy Grantham, Governor of Malta (1959–1962)
 Northern Rhodesia – Sir Evelyn Dennison Hone, Governor of Northern Rhodesia (1959–1964)

Colonial governors
Colonial governors
1960